Maria de Lourdes Martins (26 May 1926 – 31 August 2009) was a Portuguese pianist and composer.

Life
Maria de Lourdes Martins was born in Lisbon, Portugal, the daughter of Lisbon Conservatory teacher Maria Helena Martins. Martins studied at the Lisbon Conservatory with Abreu Mota, Macário Santiago Kastner and Marcos Garin.

After completing her studies, Martins took a position teaching at the Lisbon Conservatory. She introduced the Orff-Schulwerk system from the Salzburg Mozarteum in Portugal, and won the Calouste Gulbenkian Foundation Composition Award two times.

Works
Selected works include:
O Encoberto (1965)
O Litoral (1971)
Três Máscaras (Three Masks, 1984), opera 
A Donzela Guerreira (The Battling Maiden, 1995), opera

References

1926 births
2009 deaths
20th-century classical composers
Music educators
Women classical composers
Portuguese women composers
Portuguese composers
Musicians from Lisbon
Women music educators
20th-century women composers